Finders Keepers? is a children's book set in India. It is the true story about a boy who finds the author's wallet and does not understand why he should be rewarded for returning the wallet to its proper owner. The first book in the India Unveiled Children's Series, written by Robert Arnett and illustrated by Smita Turakhia, has won multiple awards, including the National Parenting Center's Seal of Approval and the Benjamin Franklin Silver Award for Best Multicultural Book of the Year.

Awards
 Independent Publisher Book Awards: Ten Outstanding Books of the Year
 Most Inspirational to Youth Book Award
 Benjamin Franklin Silver Award for Best Multicultural Book of the Year

References

See also

Official Site

2003 children's books
Books by Robert Arnett
American picture books
Children's non-fiction books